Beach handball at the 2010 Asian Beach Games was held from 9 December to 16 December 2010 in Al-Musannah Sports City, Muscat, Oman.

Medalists

Medal table

Results

Men

Preliminary round

Group A

|-
|09 Dec
|15:00
|align=right|
|align=center|1–2
|align=left|
|17–14||16–22||3–7
|-
|09 Dec
|16:00
|align=right|
|align=center|0–2
|align=left|
|8–15||14–25||
|-
|09 Dec
|18:00
|align=right|
|align=center|0–2
|align=left| Athletes from Kuwait
|6–13||12–14||
|-
|10 Dec
|16:00
|align=right|
|align=center|2–1
|align=left|
|20–22||21–18||7–6
|-
|10 Dec
|17:00
|align=right|Athletes from Kuwait 
|align=center|2–1
|align=left|
|14–15||21–2||6–5
|-
|10 Dec
|18:00
|align=right|
|align=center|2–0
|align=left|
|12–10||20–18||
|-
|11 Dec
|16:00
|align=right|
|align=center|2–0
|align=left|
|15–12||17–16||
|-
|11 Dec
|17:00
|align=right|Athletes from Kuwait 
|align=center|2–0
|align=left|
|15–11||20–14||
|-
|11 Dec
|18:00
|align=right|
|align=center|0–2
|align=left|
|8–16||12–17||
|-
|12 Dec
|12:00
|align=right|
|align=center|1–2
|align=left|
|18–13||18–21||6–9
|-
|12 Dec
|16:00
|align=right|
|align=center|2–1
|align=left|
|12–14||19–18||8–7
|-
|12 Dec
|17:00
|align=right|
|align=center|1–2
|align=left| Athletes from Kuwait
|12–9||19–22||2–5
|-
|13 Dec
|10:00
|align=right|
|align=center|1–2
|align=left|
|16–12||16–17||4–10
|-
|13 Dec
|16:00
|align=right|
|align=center|2–0
|align=left|
|18–14||19–18||
|-
|13 Dec
|17:00
|align=right|Athletes from Kuwait 
|align=center|1–2
|align=left|
|17–18||17–12||4–5
|}

Group B

|-
|09 Dec
|10:00
|align=right|
|align=center|2–0
|align=left|
|24–18||24–8||
|-
|09 Dec
|12:00
|align=right|
|align=center|2–0
|align=left|
|22–8||14–6||
|-
|10 Dec
|10:00
|align=right|
|align=center|2–0
|align=left|
|14–10||14–7||
|-
|10 Dec
|11:00
|align=right|
|align=center|2–0
|align=left|
|19–16||20–18||
|-
|11 Dec
|15:00
|align=right|
|align=center|2–0
|align=left|
|14–7||16–9||
|-
|12 Dec
|11:00
|align=right|
|align=center|2–0
|align=left|
|24–11||23–13||
|-
|12 Dec
|15:00
|align=right|
|align=center|2–0
|align=left|
|17–10||25–21||
|-
|13 Dec
|12:00
|align=right|
|align=center|1–2
|align=left|
|14–10||12–18||6–7
|-
|14 Dec
|16:00
|align=right|
|align=center|2–0
|align=left|
|17–15||22–10||
|-
|14 Dec
|17:00
|align=right|
|align=center|0–2
|align=left|
|12–15||17–18||
|}

Places 5–10

Places 9–10

|-
|15 Dec
|10:00
|align=right|
|align=center|2–0
|align=left|
|23–2||23–8||
|}

Places 7–8

|-
|15 Dec
|11:00
|align=right|
|align=center|2–0
|align=left|
|26–17||21–18||
|}

Places 5–6

|-
|15 Dec
|12:00
|align=right|
|align=center|2–1
|align=left|
|10–11||14–13||11–10
|}

Final round

Semifinals

|-
|15 Dec
|16:00
|align=right|
|align=center|1–2
|align=left|
|20–18||14–15||6–8
|-
|15 Dec
|17:00
|align=right|Athletes from Kuwait 
|align=center|2–0
|align=left|
|18–14||19–12||
|}

Bronze medal match

|-
|16 Dec
|15:00
|align=right|
|align=center|1–2
|align=left|
|18–8||12–13||4–5
|}

Gold medal match

|-
|16 Dec
|17:00
|align=right|
|align=center|0–2
|align=left| Athletes from Kuwait
|12–14||14–20||
|}

Women

|-
|09 Dec
|11:00
|align=right|
|align=center|2–0
|align=left|
|16–8||11–4||
|-
|09 Dec
|17:00
|align=right|
|align=center|2–0
|align=left|
|14–6||13–9||
|-
|10 Dec
|12:00
|align=right|
|align=center|2–0
|align=left|
|23–8||15–14||
|-
|10 Dec
|15:00
|align=right|
|align=center|2–0
|align=left|
|10–1||14–10||
|-
|12 Dec
|10:00
|align=right|
|align=center|2–0
|align=left|
|22–7||22–12||
|-
|13 Dec
|11:00
|align=right|
|align=center|2–0
|align=left|
|21–6||31–11||
|-
|13 Dec
|15:00
|align=right|
|align=center|2–1
|align=left|
|15–9||11–13||7–6
|-
|15 Dec
|15:00
|align=right|
|align=center|2–0
|align=left|
|15–9||14–6||
|-
|16 Dec
|14:00
|align=right|
|align=center|2–0
|align=left|
|14–11||18–8||
|-
|16 Dec
|16:00
|align=right|
|align=center|2–0
|align=left|
|20–13||17–12||
|}

References
 Official site

2010 Asian Beach Games events
2010 in handball
2010